Polio: An American Story by David M. Oshinsky, professor of history at the University of Texas at Austin, documents the polio epidemic in the United States during the 1940s and 1950s and the race to develop a vaccine, which led to 2 different types of polio vaccine: inactivated poliovirus vaccine, developed by a team led by Jonas Salk, and oral poliovirus vaccine, developed by a team led by Albert Sabin.  Published in 2005 by the Oxford University Press, it won the 2006 Pulitzer Prize for History and the 2005 Herbert Hoover Book Award.

Oshinky tells the story of the terror that polio outbreaks caused in suburban America, and details the role of key players, including President Franklin D. Roosevelt, who was diagnosed with polio in 1921 (or potentially misdiagnosed, see List of polio survivors), and the National Foundation for Infantile Paralysis (now the March of Dimes), which collected dimes from Americans to support research.  The story highlights the fierce competition and rivalry between Salk and Sabin, the contributions of other scientists including Isabel Morgan, and how the American experience with early polio vaccine use led to the development of regulatory processes for testing of vaccines and other drugs as part of US government licensing and for managing liability claims in the American legal system.

References

External links
Presentation by David Oshinsky on Polio, June 21, 2006, C-SPAN
Presentation by Oshinsky on Polio, October 8, 2006, C-SPAN

2005 non-fiction books
21st-century history books
History books about the United States
Works about polio
Pulitzer Prize for History-winning works
Books about diseases
Oxford University Press books